10 is a 1979 American romantic comedy film written, produced and directed by Blake Edwards and starring Dudley Moore, Julie Andrews, Robert Webber and Bo Derek. It was considered a trendsetting film at the time of its release and became one of the year's biggest box-office hits. The film follows a middle-aged man who becomes infatuated with a young woman whom he has never met, leading to a comic chase and an encounter in Mexico.

Plot 
During a surprise 42nd birthday party for the wealthy and famous composer George Webber thrown by his actress girlfriend Samantha Taylor, George finds that he is coping badly with his age. From his car, George glimpses a bride on her way to be married and is instantly obsessed with her beauty. Following her to the church, he crashes into a police cruiser, is stung by a bee and nearly disrupts the wedding ceremony.

Later that night, Sam and George argue over his treatment of women and his habit of spying on the intimate acts of a neighbor (which later turns out to be consensual).

George visits the reverend who performed the wedding and learns that the woman is Jenny Miles, daughter of a prominent Beverly Hills dentist.

The following day, while spying on his neighbor, George hits himself with the telescope and falls down an embankment, causing him to miss Sam's phone call. Still obsessed with Jenny, he schedules a dental appointment with her father and learns that Jenny and her husband David have gone to Mexico for their honeymoon. The effects of a comically implausible amount of treatment accompanied by a heavy dose of novocaine, aggravated by immediate heavy drinking, leave George completely incoherent. Sam finally reaches him on the phone, but mistakes him for an intruder and calls the police, who hold George at gunpoint while trying to understand his gibberish. George visits his neighbor's house to take part in an ongoing orgy, but Sam spots him through his telescope, widening the rift between them.

George impulsively boards a plane to follow the newlyweds to their exclusive resort in Mexico. In the bar, George encounters old acquaintance Mary Lewis, who lacks self-confidence. When they attempt a fling, Mary interprets George's inadequacy in bed as confirmation of her own insecurities.

At the beach, George sees Jenny in a swimsuit and is awestruck again by her beauty. Noticing that her husband has fallen asleep on a surfboard, George rents a catamaran and rescues David, making him a hero. Sam sees George on a TV newscast and tries to contact him unsuccessfully. David is hospitalized with sunburn, allowing Jenny and George to spend time alone together. Jenny smokes marijuana and seduces George, but he is horrified when Jenny takes a call from David and casually informs him of George's presence. George is even more confused with David's complete lack of concern. Jenny explains their open and honest relationship and reveals that she married David only because of pressure from her conservative father. George leaves after realizing that Jenny sees their tryst as nothing more than a casual fling.

After flying home, George reconciles with Sam by apologizing and demonstrating a new maturity. George takes an idea from Jenny when he starts Boléro on his phonograph (lasting  minutes, an appropriate duration for lovemaking) and he makes love with Sam in full view of the neighbor's telescope, but the neighbor, frustrated that he provides erotic entertainment for George and gets nothing in return, is by now not watching.

Cast
 Dudley Moore as George Webber
 Julie Andrews as Samantha Taylor
 Bo Derek as Jenny Hanley
 Robert Webber as Hugh
 Dee Wallace as Mary Lewis
 Sam J. Jones as David Hanley
 Nedra Volz as Mrs. Kissell
 Brian Dennehy as Don, The Bartender
 Max Showalter as Reverend
 Peter Sellers as Night Club Drummer (cameo, scene cut)

Casting 
Dudley Moore was a last-minute replacement for George Segal. Edwards sued Segal and won $270,000.

Release 
10 was released by Warner Bros. on October 5, 1979, opening in 706 theaters. It was released on DVD through Warner Home Video on May 21, 1997, and a Blu-ray edition was released on February 1, 2011. The supplemental material consists of the original theatrical trailer and a four-minute promotional documentary, present on both media.

Reception 
10 opened at number one in the United States, earning $3,526,692 ($ in ) for its opening weekend. The film went on to make a total of $74,865,517 ($ in ) in the U.S. by the end of 1980, making it one of the top-grossing films released in 1979. It received mostly positive reviews from critics. On Rotten Tomatoes, it has an approval rating of 68% based on 25 reviews, with an average rating of 6.50/10. The site's consensus states: "Blake Edwards' bawdy comedy may not score a perfect 10, but Dudley Moore's self-deprecating performance makes this midlife crisis persistently funny." On Metacritic, the film has a score of 68% based on reviews from seven critics, indicating "generally favorable reviews."

Vincent Canby of The New York Times described 10 as "frequently hilarious," praising the performances by Moore and Andrews and concluding that the film "is loaded with odd surprises." Roger Ebert of the Chicago Sun-Times gave the film a four-star review, calling it "one of the best films Blake Edwards has ever made." He named 10 one of the best films of 1979, ranking it 10th on his yearly top-ten list. Gene Siskel of the Chicago Tribune called the film "a very funny comedy that couldn't be more serious about the plight of its lead character." He also noted that the film "turns out to be a gentle essay on the problems of male menopause."

The New York Times placed the film on its Best 1000 Movies Ever list.

Accolades

Cultural impact 
Bo Derek's role shot her to instant stardom and status as a sex symbol. Her beaded and plaited cornrow hairstyle in the film was widely copied.

The film also brought renewed fame to the one-movement orchestral piece Boléro by Maurice Ravel, whose music was still under copyright at the time. As a result of the film, sales of  Boléro generated an estimated $1 million in royalties and briefly made Ravel the best-selling classical composer 40 years after his death. Derek appeared in a 1984 film named Bolero, titled to capitalize upon the piece's renewed popularity.

In tenpin bowling, broadcaster Rob Stone often refers to a player who scores ten consecutive strikes a Bo Derek, the perfect 10.

Remake
In 2003, it was announced that Blake Edwards would direct a remake to be titled 10 Again for MDP Worldwide, but the project was abandoned.

References

External links 
 
 
 
 

1979 films
1979 romantic comedy films
1970s sex comedy films
1970s American films
American romantic comedy films
American sex comedy films
Casual sex in films
1970s English-language films
Films about adultery in the United States
Films scored by Henry Mancini
Films directed by Blake Edwards
Films set in Los Angeles
Films set in Mexico
Midlife crisis films
Orion Pictures films
Warner Bros. films
Films with screenplays by Blake Edwards